Elson James Harkema (born June 25, 1942) is former American football player and coach.  He served as the head football coach at Grand Valley State University in Allendale, Michigan from 1973 to 1982 and at Eastern Michigan University from 1983 to 1992, compiling a career college football record of 109–86–6.  Harkema played college football as a quarterback at Kalamazoo College.

Early life, education, and playing career
Harkema attended Owosso High School in Owosso, Michigan, where he played football, basketball, and tennis.  He then matriculated at Kalamazoo College, where earned a total of ten varsity letters in those same three sports, and graduated in 1964 with a major in economics and a minor in physical education.  Harkema earned a master's degree in 1967 from Western Michigan University.

Coaching career

Grand Valley State
Harkema was the head coach of the Grand Valley State Lakers football team from 1973 through the 1982 season, compiling a record of 68–29–1 with winning seasons in nine of his ten years.  In the 1978 season, his team qualified for the NAIA Football National Championship and won their quarterfinal playoff game against Wisconsin–La Crosse, but lost in the semifinals against Elon. The air option was pioneered by Homer Rice, a former head coach for Cincinnati. Harkema brought the air option offense to Grand Valley State in 1979.

Eastern Michigan
In 1982, following the team's 22nd consecutive loss, Mike Stock was fired as head coach of the Eastern Michigan Hurons football team. Assistant coach Bob LaPointe was named the interim head coach for the remainder of the season while the school conducted a national search, and Harkema was hired to lead the team beginning in 1983. Harkema again instilled the air option offense for Eastern Michigan. Beginning in 1986, Harkema led the team to four consecutive winning seasons, including Eastern's only Mid-American Conference championship and only 10-win season in 1987, when the team went to the 1987 California Bowl and upset 17½ point favorite San Jose State University for the only bowl game win in school history. Harkema is credited with building the program at Eastern Michigan into a "Top-Shelf" program, and he coached one of just two EMU games at Rynearson Stadium that sold-out: a 24–31 loss to Western Michigan on October 22, 1988 drew 23,003 (listed capacity at the time was 22,227), and a 0–0 tie against Eastern Kentucky on October 16, 1971 drew 17,360 (listed capacity at the time was 15,500).

EMU began investigating the appropriateness of its Huron logo after the Michigan Department of Civil Rights issued a report in October 1988 suggesting that all schools using such logos drop them. At that time, four colleges, 62 high schools and 33 junior high/middle schools in Michigan used Native American logos or names, including Mid-American Conference rival Central Michigan University. On May 22, 1991, the EMU Board of Regents voted to replace the Huron name with Eagles, taken from three recommendations from a committee charged with supplying a new nickname. The controversy over the nickname continues to this day, as many former students and faculty were angered that a unique name like Hurons was replaced by a common name like Eagles for reasons of political correctness, some alumni refuse to donate money to the school until the name Hurons is restored. An official chapter of the EMU Alumni Association, the Huron Restoration Chapter, seeks to bring back the name and claims to have the support of Chief Leaford Bearskin of the Wyandot Tribe of Oklahoma and former Grand Chief Max Gros-Louis of the Huron-Wendat Nation of Quebec. Following the name change, the football team struggled, and after losing the first four games of the 1992 season, Harkema resigned, and assistant coach Jan Quarless took over for the remainder of the season.

In total, Harkema was the head coach at Eastern Michigan for ten seasons, from 1983 until 1992. His coaching record at Eastern Michigan was 41–57–5.

Head coaching record

College

References 

Living people
1942 births
American football quarterbacks
American men's basketball players
Eastern Michigan Eagles football coaches
Grand Valley State Lakers football coaches
Kalamazoo Hornets football players
Kalamazoo Hornets men's basketball players
Kalamazoo Hornets men's tennis players
Northern Illinois Huskies football coaches
Western Michigan Broncos football coaches
Western Michigan University alumni
High school football coaches in Illinois
High school football coaches in Michigan
Junior college football coaches in the United States
People from Owosso, Michigan
Players of American football from Michigan
American people of Dutch descent